Bridlewood can refer to:

Places
Bridlewood, Ottawa, a neighbourhood in Ottawa, Ontario, Canada
Bridlewood, Calgary, a neighbourhood in Calgary, Alberta, Canada
Bridlewood, a neighbourhood in the Tam O'Shanter-Sullivan and L'Amoreaux  neighbourhoods in Toronto(Scarborough), Canada
Bridlewood, a neighborhood in Bristow, Virginia (Prince William County), United States
Bridlewood, Nebraska, a neighborhood in Omaha, Nebraska, United States

Other
Bridlewood Community Elementary School, an elementary and middle school in Ottawa, Ontario, Canada
Somerset-Bridlewood (C-Train), a C-Train station in Calgary, Alberta, Canada
 Bridlewood Mall, a shopping center in Toronto, Ontario, Canada